In mathematics, specifically in category theory, a functor 

 

Any functor that is part of an equivalence of categories is essentially surjective. As a partial converse, any full and faithful functor that is essentially surjective is part of an equivalence of categories.

Notes

References

External links

Functors